Caraga, officially the Municipality of Caraga, is a 1st class municipality in the province of Davao Oriental, Philippines. According to the 2020 census, it has a population of 39,704 people. It is one of the oldest settlements in the island of Mindanao.

The Pusan Point located in the town of Caraga is geographically the easternmost point of the Philippines.

History
The official founding of Caraga as a municipality was in October 29, 1903, under Organic Act 21, making it one of the oldest towns of the province of Davao Oriental. As early as 1591 Caraga was already listed as a mission registered under the jurisdiction of Encomienda of Bislig.

The etymology of the word “Caraga” is named after the Kalagan people (Spanish "Caragan"), a Mansakan subgroup (related to Visayans) native to the regions of Davao and parts of Caraga who speak the Kalagan languages. The name itself is from kalagan (literally "[strong] spirited") which means "fierce" or "brave"; from kalag ("spirit" or "soul") in the native animistic anito religions.

Hence, the whole Provincia de Caraga of 1622 was called "region de gente animosa", that is "region of spirited men". This being "spirited men and women" is grounded on its cultural, religious and political background. With culture, Caragans were spirited in view of their closeness to nature and attitude towards the creation. With religiosity, Caragans were spirited as to their belief on the spirits of nature (like the trees "balete tree", the rivers and mountains, sun and moon); in fact, they have "anito worship" and "ancestor worship" led by the dancing priestess (balyan) and the singing priestess (catalunan). With primitive politics, Caragans were spirited as they invited a "bagani system" of governance. A "bagani" is like a "warrior" kinglet or datu" who ruled by banditry and by occupation.

Geography
It lies along the eastern coast of this province, facing the Pacific Ocean. It is bounded in the north by the Municipality of Baganga in the south by the municipality of Manay, in the west by the Municipality of New Bataan, Compostela Valley Province, and on the east by the Pacific Ocean. Pusan point of Barangay Santiago is the easternmost point of the Philippines.

Caraga coastline is irregular and the municipality is traversed by the two rivers: Caraga River in the south and Manurigao River in the north.

Land area
Caraga has a total land area , representing 12.45% of the total land area of the Province of Davao Oriental, and seventeen (17) barangays.

Barangays

Caraga is politically subdivided into 17 barangays.

Climate
Caraga has a tropical rainforest climate (Af) with very heavy rainfall from December to February and moderate to heavy rainfall in the remaining months.

Demographics

Based on the 2010 census, the Municipality has a total population of 36,912 people, or about 7.1% of the total population of the province.

Of the 17 barangays comprising the municipality, Pichon has the highest population of 5,188 or 14.1% of the municipality's population. Barangay Poblacion is the second population barangay at 4,710 equivalent to 12.8% of the total population and this is closely followed by Barangay Sobrecarey which has a population of 4,544 or 12.3% of the population of Caraga.

Barangay Alvar is the least populated barangay contributing only 1.7% or 627 persons to the total populations. It is followed by Barangay San Miguel, which has 833 people, and Barangay D.L. Balante which has population of 834 or 2.3% of the entire population.

Language
Household population by mother tongue (based on 1990 participation rate):
Cebuano   -   30%
Hiligaynon   -   .22%
Bagobo   -         .032%
Bilaan        -      .35%
Butanon   -    .17%
Davaweño   - 93.45%
Mandaya    -   99%
Yakan         -   .14%
Not stated   - .51%

Economy
Coconut products are the inhabitants main source of income aside from some lucrative business.

The municipality of Caraga has sixteen (16) wholesale trade establishment which are mostly involved in the buy and sell agricultural products. Four of these establishment are found in Barangay Poblacion while the rest are found in other Barangays. Retail establishment, which includes repair/welding shops, dormitory, lodging houses, cable television, telephone services providers, total to 23, most of which are found in the Poblacion.

The present industries thriving in the locality are the agriculture based, presently there are nine rice /corn mills found in Barangay San Luis, San Antonio, Poblacion, San Pedro, San Jose, and P.M Sobrecarey. There are also one furniture shop in the poblacion and one handicraft industry making dagmay novelties.

Tourism
Scenic spots:
 Jubilee Cross, Pusan Point - a  Jubilee cross made of cement and sand meant as a landmark of Millennium Sunrise event ushering the historic great Jubilee Year 2000 celebration located at Barangay Santiago, Caraga, Davao Oriental, First Light First Sight. 
 Santiago Cave - a  cave near the shoreline before reaching Pusan Point, with century-old human fossils with lengths beyond the standard measure of a native Filipino fossils.
 Old Church and Convento - a century-old building of San Salvador Parish, which served as the central mission station of the Spanish missionaries, it is made of Tisa out of the processed shells from the seashores of Caraga, the convento ground floor served as a temporary prison cell sometimes during the Spanish occupation.
 Parish Development Center - a T-shaped building within hectare land area of the San Salvador Parish of Caraga which serves as the center for seminars, retreats, and conference overlooking the Pusan Point from the Southeast Pacific Coast.
 Tourism Complex - a 3-story building meant to house the Davao Oriental Historical Museum and some historical Artifacts w / utmost significance to the Mandayan Cultural customs and traditions.
Bango Beach Resort
 Kapuka Falls in Lamiawan
 Oguad Falls in Lamiawan
 Sungkuan Falls in P.M. Sobrecarey
 Kiti-kiti Falls in Pichon
 Bawgo Beach in Poblacion, Bawgo
 Friar's Beach (LIKSIM) Beach Resort in Poblacion
 Sunrise at Pusan Point, Barangay Santiago
 Crystal Cave in Santiago
 Philippine Eagle's Nest at Maglahus, P.M. Sobrecarey

Transportation

The municipal has 14 bridges. 4 of these bridges are reinforced concrete, located along the national Road.

References

External links
 Caraga Profile at the DTI Cities and Municipalities Competitive Index
 [ Philippine Standard Geographic Code]
 Philippine Census Information
 Local Governance Performance Management System

Municipalities of Davao Oriental